Wild World is the fourth studio album by American country music singer Kip Moore. It was released on May 29, 2020 by Universal Music Group Nashville. The album includes the single "She’s Mine". A deluxe edition containing four extra songs was released on February 12, 2021.

Content
The album contains thirteen tracks, of which Moore co-wrote all but one. Among his contributions to the album is the lead single "She's Mine". Moore co-produced the album with David Garcia, Luke Dick, and Blair Daly, all of whom also wrote some of the songs on it. Other contributing writers include touring band members Erich Wigdahl, Manny Medina, Dave Nassie, and Adam Browder, who helped him write "South" during a sound check. Moore also said that "Payin' Hard" was inspired by the death of his father, which occurred right before the release of his debut album.

On October 29, 2020, Moore released the song "Don't Go Changing" ahead of the release of the deluxe edition.

Critical reception
Billy Dukes of Taste of Country reviewed the album favorably, calling it his "most urgent album to date", praising the lyrics of "Southpaw", "Fire and Flame", and "Payin' Hard" in particular while also noting the varied influences in the arrangement and production.

Track listing

Personnel
Adapted from the album's liner notes.

Vocals
 Kip Moore – lead vocals (all tracks), background vocals (tracks 4, 6, 8, 10, 12)
 Brett James – background vocals (track 3)
 Rick Huckaby – background vocals (tracks 2, 11)
 Luke Dick – background vocals (tracks 5, 16)

Instruments

 Kip Moore – acoustic guitar (tracks 2, 9, 12)
 Rob McNelley – acoustic guitar (track 1), electric guitar (tracks 1, 7, 8)
 Tom Bukovac – acoustic guitar (track 10), electric guitar (tracks 2-4, 6, 7, 10-15, 17)
 Dave Nassie – acoustic guitar (track 13), electric guitar (tracks 10, 11, 15)
 Kenny Greenberg – electric guitar (track 16)
 Danny Rader – electric guitar (track 6)
 Rich Brinsfield – bass guitar (tracks 1, 3, 4, 6, 7, 10, 12, 14, 15, 17)
 Manny Medina – bass guitar (tracks 2, 11)
 David Garcia – bass guitar (track 9), electric guitar (track 9), keyboards (track 9), programming (track 9)

 Blair Daly – bass guitar (track 8), programming (track 8)
 Luke Dick – bass guitar (track 5, 16), electric guitar (5, 16), drums (track 5), keyboards (tracks 5, 16)
 Matt Bubel – drums (tracks 3, 4, 6, 7, 12, 14), percussion (tracks 4, 7, 11), programming (track 11)
 Fred Eltringham — drums (track 16)
 Miles McPherson — drums (track 9)
 Erich Wigdahl – drums (tracks 1, 2, 11, 13, 15, 17)
 Will Weatherly – percussion (track 3), programming (track 3)
 Dave Cohen – keyboards (tracks 1-4, 6, 7, 10-15, 17), piano (track 6)

Production

 Kip Moore – producer (all tracks except 5 & 16)
 Blair Daly – producer (track 8)
 David Garcia – producer (track 9), recording, mixing

 Luke Dick – producer (track 5, 16), recording, mixing
 Dave Salley – recording, mixing
 Joe LaPorta – mastering (Sterling Sound)

Imagery

 Kip Moore – art direction
 Marc Harkness – cover art design
 Craig Allen – design
 Spidey Smith – photography

 Debra Wingo – grooming
 Katy Robbins – wardrobe stylist
 Kera Jackson – art production
 Sarah Marie Burke – A&R production

Charts

References

2020 albums
Kip Moore albums
MCA Records albums